João Paulo dos Santos Fernandes (born 11 August 1984) is a Portuguese boccia player and three-time Paralympic champion.

He took two gold medals at the 2004 Summer Paralympics in Athens, and one gold and one silver at the 2008 Summer Paralympics in Beijing.

Notes

References

External links
 

1984 births
Living people
Paralympic boccia players of Portugal
Paralympic gold medalists for Portugal
Paralympic silver medalists for Portugal
Paralympic medalists in boccia
Boccia players at the 2004 Summer Paralympics
Boccia players at the 2008 Summer Paralympics
Medalists at the 2004 Summer Paralympics
Medalists at the 2008 Summer Paralympics
Sportspeople from Aveiro District